Fox Cove-Mortier is a town east of Marystown, Newfoundland and Labrador on the Burin Peninsula. It was traditionally supported by the fishing industry, and has a long and storied history in the fish trade between Newfoundland and the Caribbean.

Demographics 

See also
List of cities and towns in Newfoundland and Labrador

References

Towns in Newfoundland and Labrador